Franz Xaver Freiherr von Auffenberg (1744-23 December 1815) was a general in the Austrian army.

Biography
He began his career as an oberst in the 1793 Austrian Netherlands campaign of the War of the First Coalition. He was promoted major general in February 1797 for his service at the battle of Würzburg and battle of Wetzlar. During the War of the Second Coalition he commanded a corps in the Swiss Graubünden. On 7 March 1799 he was beaten on the Luziensteig by André Masséna and his force and he was captured the following day when he withdrew to Chur.

He was freed after the Treaty of Lunéville and rejoined the Austrian army, commanding a force of 5,500 men as a fieldmarshal-lieutenant during the War of the Third Coalition. From 1803 to 1807 he was owner and honorary oberst of the 37th Infantry Regiment. At Wertingen on 8 October 1805 he was beaten by French troops under Joachim Murat. His defeat there opened the way to Austria's defeat at Ulm and Austerlitz and so he was court martialled in 1805, placed on the inactive list and dismissed from the army in 1807.

Bibliography
 Moderne Biographien oder kurze Nachrichten von dem Leben und den Thaten der berühmtesten Menschen, welche sich seit dem Anfange der französischen Revolution bis zu dem Wiener Frieden als Regenten, Feldherrn (etc.) ausgezeichnet haben (etc.) von Karl Reichard, Leipzig, Hammer 1811
Bibliographical Dictionary of all Austrian Generals during the French Revolutionary and Napoleonic Wars, Leopold Kudrna

1744 births
1815 deaths
Austrian Empire military leaders of the French Revolutionary Wars
Austrian Empire commanders of the Napoleonic Wars